Govaerts is a Flemish or Dutch surname. Notable people with the surname include:

Abraham Govaerts (1589–1626), Flemish painter
Hendrick Govaerts (1669-1720), Flemish painter
Johan Baptist Govaerts (c. 1701 - after 1745), Flemish painter
Luc Govaerts (born 1959), Belgian cyclist
Rafaël Govaerts (born 1968), Belgian botanist